The 2011 FIA GT1 Ordos round was an auto racing event held at the Ordos International Circuit, Ordos City, China on 2–4 September, and was the eighth round of the 2011 FIA GT1 World Championship season. It was the FIA GT1 World Championship's first race held in China, as well as at the  Ordos. The event was supported by Formula Pilota, and the overall event was held under the title of the Kangbashi Cup.

Background

This was the home round of Exim Bank Team China who ran two Corvettes for the first time this season with four all new drivers including Chinese racer Ho-Pin Tung.

DKR Engineering replaced their single Corvette with two Lamborghini's for this round and also with four new drivers. Jonathan Hirschi replaced Vanina Ickx in the No. 9 Belgian Racing Ford GT alongside regular Christoffer Nygaard.

Qualifying

Qualifying result
For qualifying, Driver 1 participates in the first and third sessions while Driver 2 participates in only the second session.  The fastest lap for each session is indicated with bold.

Races

Qualifying Race

Race result

Championship Race

Race result

References

External links
 Ordos GT1 Race in China – FIA GT1 World Championship

Ordos
FIA GT1 Ordos